Spencer Lovejoy (born 14 May 1998 in Connecticut) is an American professional squash player. As of October 2021, he was ranked number 69 in the world. He has competed in multiple PSA professional tournaments and earned his first PSA title at the Mississauga Open in 2019. He played for the Yale Bulldogs men's squash team playing in the #1 seat all 4 years of his college career. He was a four-time First-Team All-American, winner of the Skillman Award for Sportsmanship in 2020, and named team captain his senior year.

References

1998 births
Living people
American male squash players
Yale Bulldogs men's squash players